Aggeneys Airport  is an airport serving Aggeneys, a town in the Northern Cape, South Africa.

Facilities

See also
 List of airports in South Africa

References

External links
 

Airports in South Africa
Transport in the Northern Cape
Namakwa District Municipality